Lydia J. Reid is an American politician of the Democratic Party who served as the first female and longest-serving mayor of Mansfield, Ohio encompassing three four-year terms from 1993 to 2007.

Reid retired due to term limits, after serving her last day in office on November 30, 2007; her successor Donald Culliver, the city's first black mayor, assumed office on December 1, 2007.

Notes

References
 Mansfield News Journal, November 30, 2007. Adieu, Lydia: Mansfield Mayor Reid given grand sendoff before leaving office today, editorial.

External links
former mayor Reid at City of Mansfield website

Mayors of places in Ohio
Ohio Democrats
Politicians from Mansfield, Ohio
Living people
Women mayors of places in Ohio
Year of birth missing (living people)
21st-century American women